Wilson M. Compton is the deputy director of the National Institute on Drug Abuse (NIDA). Before being appointed to this position in 2013, he was the director of the NIDA's Division of Epidemiology, Services and Prevention Research since 2002. He has also served as a member of the DSM-5 Task Force and the Substance Use Disorders Workgroup. Before joining NIDA, he was an associate professor of psychiatry at Washington University in St. Louis and the medical director of addiction services at Barnes-Jewish Hospital.

Work
Compton has studied trends in the use of illegal drugs in the United States, including marijuana, and the frequency with which Americans misuse opioid painkillers that they are prescribed.

Awards
Compton received the Senior Scholar Health Services Research Award from the American Psychiatric Association in 2008, the Paul Hoch Award from the American Psychopathological Association in 2010, and two Leveraging Collaboration Awards from the Food and Drug Administration (one in 2012 and one in 2013). He received the Department of Health and Human Services' Secretary’s Award for Meritorious Service in 2013 and their Award for Distinguished Service in 2014.

References

External links

Biography at NIDA website

Living people
American psychiatrists
National Institutes of Health faculty
Washington University in St. Louis faculty
Year of birth missing (living people)